Below is the list of Jagiellon Poland ambassadors to Ottoman Empire in the 15th and 16th centuries. The diplomatic relations began in 1414 soon after the Ottoman Interregnum during the reign of first Jagiellon king of Polond-Lithuania.  The names of the monarchs in 1414 were Jogaila and Mehmet I.

References

 
Polish diplomats
Turkey diplomacy-related lists
Lists of ambassadors of Poland
History of Poland during the Jagiellonian dynasty
Turkey history-related lists